Brightwalton is a village and civil parish in the Berkshire Downs centred  NNW of Newbury in West Berkshire.

Parish church
The Church of England parish church of All Saints existed by the time of the Domesday Book of 1086. The building was demolished in 1863 and replaced by a Gothic Revival one designed by G E Street, who was architect to the Diocese of Oxford. Street retained and re-used some 13th century Early English Gothic features from the original building.

School
The parish has a Church of England primary school. It too was designed by Street and built in 1863.

Transport
Bus travel from Newbury is provided by service 107.

Notable residents
In about 1715 the Savo(u)ry family moved to the village from nearby South Moreton. The Savorys were wheelwrights, but William Savory (1768–1824) from a third generation of the family, was apprenticed to David Jones, an apothecary in Newbury, Berkshire. Aged 20, Savory "walked the wards" of St Thomas' Hospital and Guy's Hospital in London. He learned surgery, physic (medicine) and midwifery from the leading practitioners of their day, including the surgeon Henry Cline and physician William Saunders. Some of his student notes and his commonplace book survive. Savory became a member of the Company of Surgeons and initially practiced in Newbury. Following bankruptcy in 1795 he re-settled in Brightwalton, where he remained for the rest of his life, passing the mantle to his son, William Savory (1793–1856) who studied at the London Hospital in Whitechapel.

Sir Samuel Eyre (1638–98), Justice of the King's Bench, lived in the parish, having inherited the manor of Brightwalton in 1694 through his wife Lady Martha Lucy. Their son Robert Eyre, also of Brightwalton, became Lord Chief Justice.  

The author Monica Dickens lived in the village in the last years of her life. Prolific children's author Rosemary Hayes went to school locally.

Demography

See also
 List of civil parishes in Berkshire
 List of places in Berkshire

References

Sources

External links

 
Villages in Berkshire
Civil parishes in Berkshire
West Berkshire District